Back Pay may refer to:
 Back Pay (1922 film)
 Back Pay (1930 film)